L. G. "Big" Sam was a college football player.

University of Texas
He was a prominent guard for the Texas Longhorns football team of the University of Texas.  He was "a wonder at opening holes;" chosen for an all-time Texas team by R. W. Franklin.

1900
Sam was a member of the undefeated 1900 team. He was selected All-Southern.

References

American football guards
All-Southern college football players
Texas Longhorns football players
19th-century players of American football